Dalilah Sappenfield is an American figure skating coach and choreographer who specializes in pair skating. She has worked as a coach since 1993 and is the 2008 USFSA/PSA Coach of the Year, an award she won after her pair teams won the gold medals at the novice, junior, and senior levels at the 2008 U.S. Figure Skating Championships. Her pair Alexa Scimeca Knierim & Chris Knierim qualified to the 2018 Winter Olympics. She is the adoptive mother of Laureano Ibarra, and he and his first partner were her first pair team.

Sappenfield coaches in Monument, Colorado at the Monument Ice Rinks. She has coached Alexa Scimeca Knierim & Chris Knierim to two U.S. National titles (2015, 2018), Keauna McLaughlin & Rockne Brubaker to two U.S. National titles (2008, 2009), Caydee Denney & John Coughlin to the 2012 National title and Caitlin Yankowskas & John Coughlin to the 2011 National title. She also coached McLaughlin & Brubaker to the 2007 World Junior title and the  2006 Junior Grand Prix Final title. Her pair teams have won several medals on the  ISU Grand Prix and the ISU Junior Grand Prix. Additional skaters she has coached include Jessica Rose Paetsch & Jon Nuss, Meeran Trombley & Laureano Ibarra, Brittany Vise & Nicholas Kole, Igor Macypura, and Austin Kanallakan.

U.S. National Champions coached by Sappenfield include:

 Alexa Scimeca Knierim & Chris Knierim – 2018, 2015
 Caydee Denney & John Coughlin – 2012
 Caitlin Yankowskas & John Coughlin – 2011
 Keauna McLaughlin & Rockne Brubaker – 2009, 2008
 Nica Digerness & Danny Neudecker – 2017 (junior)
 Madeline Aaron & Max Settlage – 2014 (junior)
 Britney Simpson & Matthew Blackmer – 2013 (junior)
 Haven Denney & Brandon Frazier – 2012 (junior)
 Jessica Rose Paetsch & Jon Nuss – 2008 (junior)
 Keauna McLaughlin & Rockne Brubaker – 2007 (junior)
 Mariel Miller & Rockne Brubaker – 2005 (junior)
 Kate Finster & Eric Hartley – 2015 (novice)
 Madeline Aaron & Max Settlage – 2011 (novice)
 Brynn Carman & Chris Knierim – 2008 (novice)
 Jessica Rose Paetsch & Jon Nuss – 2006 (novice)
 Claire Davis & Nathan Miller – 2005 (novice)

Allegations of abuse and suspension by SafeSport
On October 8, 2021, USA Today published an exposé by Christine Brennan in which former pairs skater Tarah Kayne detailed alleged emotional and psychological abuse she suffered while being coached by Sappenfield. Kayne ultimately left Sappenfield with her skating partner, Danny O'Shea, in September 2020, before Kayne retired in December that same year. Kayne stated that Sappenfield's abuse prompted her to engage in self-harm behaviors, and that she'd been afraid to seek mental health treatment out of concern that Sappenfield would find out. She said to Brennan, "these awful experiences forced me out of the sport I love. Dalilah said multiple times that she wanted to end my career, and she succeeded." O'Shea expressed his support for Kayne on social media. Kayne was one of several skaters to file complaints against Sappenfield with the United States Center for SafeSport, leading to her suspension pending further investigation.

References

Year of birth missing (living people)
Living people
American figure skating coaches
Figure skating choreographers
Female sports coaches